"Urge" is the second single from the album Endless, Nameless by The Wildhearts. The single was released in three different formats featuring different B-sides. Former guitarist Devin Townsend sings backing vocals on the CD1 B-side "Kill Me To Death". "Genius Penis" was written by drummer Ritch Battersby and features guest vocals by Vickie Perks from Fuzzbox.

CD1:

1. Urge 
2. Fugazi (Do The Fake) 
3. Kill Me To Death

CD2:

1. Urge 
2. Zomboid 
3. Genius Penis

7":

A. Urge 
B. Lost Highway

Released: October 1997 · Label: Mushroom Records · UK Chart: No. 26
Formats: CD1 (MUSH14CD), CD2 (MUSH14CDX), 7" Vinyl (MUSH14S)

The Wildhearts songs
1997 songs
Mushroom Records singles